Árheimar (Old Norse "river home") was a capital of the Goths, according to the Hervarar saga. The saga states that it was located at Danparstaðir ("Dnieper stead"), which is identified with the ruins of Kamjans'ke Horodyšče, near Kamianka-Dniprovska. .

Hervarar saga 

The name first appears in the Hervarar saga when Angantyr has avenged his father Heidrek and retaken the Dwarf-cursed sword Tyrfing:

It was during this feast that Angantyr's Hunnish half-brother Hlöd appeared with a large army to demand half the inheritance:

The next place is when Angantyr's brave sister Hervor fights the Huns, although, her small army is greatly outnumbered by the Horde and she knows she cannot win:

Arheimar is mentioned for the last time, when the Geatish king Gizur has arrived with his army from Scandinavia to fight for the Goths, and tells the Huns where they and the Goths are to meet the Huns in battle. Hlöd demeans Gizur by calling him an Ostrogoth (Gryting) and Angantyr's man from Arheimar, and not a king of the Geats:

Notes

Sources

  ,  e-text 
Also Kershaw's translation alongside  the Old Norse Hervarar Saga og Heiðreks [The Saga of Hervör and Heithrek] 

Gothic cities and towns
Saga locations
Tyrfing cycle
Populated places on the Dnieper